Kim Min-hyeok (born 27 February 1992) is a South Korean professional footballer who is playing for Seongnam FC in the K League 1 as a defender.

Club career
He played for the youth academy of Hamburger SV before joining the same of Soongsil University in 2009. In 2014, he signed for Sagan Tosu. He made his debut against Urawa Reds.

International career
Kim was part of the senior South Korea squad for the 2015 EAFF East Asian Cup.

Club statistics
Updated to 5 May 2022.

References

External links

Kim Min-hyeok at Asian Games Incheon 2014
 Kim Min-hyeok – National Team stats at KFA 

1992 births
Living people
Association football defenders
South Korean footballers
South Korea under-23 international footballers
Footballers from Seoul
Sagan Tosu players
Jeonbuk Hyundai Motors players
Seongnam FC players
J1 League players
K League 1 players
Footballers at the 2014 Asian Games
Asian Games medalists in football
Asian Games gold medalists for South Korea
Medalists at the 2014 Asian Games